Computational and Theoretical Chemistry is a peer-reviewed scientific journal published by Elsevier. It was established in 1985 as Journal of Molecular Structure: THEOCHEM, a spin-off of the Journal of Molecular Structure. It obtained its current name in 2011 and covers molecular structure in theoretical chemistry.

Abstracting, indexing, and impact factor 
According to the Journal Citation Reports, the journal had a 2020 impact factor of 1.926.

It is indexed in the following bibliographic databases:
Chemical Abstracts
ScienceDirect
Inspec
Scopus
Web of Science
Current Contents - Physical, Chemical & Earth Sciences

References

External links 
 

Chemistry journals
English-language journals
Publications established in 1985
Elsevier academic journals
Biweekly journals